Peter Guinness (born 14 August 1950) is an English film, television, and theatre actor.

Career
He has appeared in over fifty television productions and over ten films. Guinness has also appeared onstage in an adaptation of The Pianist.

Personal life
He is married to Roberta Taylor, an actress and writer.

Filmography

Film

Television

Audio-dramas

Other

Stage
 Alberto Sholez in Moby Dick. World premiere adapted and directed by Michael Elliott at the Royal Exchange, Manchester. (1984)
 Jaques in  As You Like It. Directed by Marianne Elliott at the Royal Exchange, Manchester. (2000)
Stage adaptation of The Pianist, (2007), Manchester International Festival
 Thomas Danforth in The Crucible by Arthur Miller. Directed by Caroline Steinbeis at the Royal Exchange, Manchester. (2015)

References

External links

1950 births
Living people
Male actors from Liverpool
English male film actors
English male stage actors
English male television actors
20th-century English male actors
21st-century English male actors